The men's bantamweight (63 kilograms) event at the 2018 Asian Games took place on 22 August 2018 at Jakarta Convention Center Plenary Hall, Jakarta, Indonesia.

Schedule
All times are Western Indonesia Time (UTC+07:00)

Results

Final

Top half

Bottom half

References

External links
Official website

Taekwondo at the 2018 Asian Games